Mohammed Fadel (born 27 October 1963) is an Iraqi footballer. He competed in the men's tournament at the 1984 Summer Olympics. Fadel played for Iraq in 1984.

References

External links
 

1963 births
Living people
Iraqi footballers
Iraq international footballers
Olympic footballers of Iraq
Footballers at the 1984 Summer Olympics
Place of birth missing (living people)
Association football defenders
Al-Shorta SC players